Tanzania comprises many lakes, national parks, and Africa's highest point, Mount Kilimanjaro. Northeast Tanzania is mountainous, while the central area is part of a large plateau covered in grasslands. The country also contains the southern portion of Lake Victoria on its northern border with Uganda and Kenya.

Administratively, Tanzania is divided into 31 regions, with twenty-five on the mainland, three on Unguja (known informally as Zanzibar Island), and two on Pemba Island.

Physical Geography 
Northeast Tanzania exhibits a mountainous terrain and includes Mount Meru, an active volcano, Mount Kilimanjaro, a dormant volcano, and the Usambara and Pare mountain ranges. Kilimanjaro attracts thousands of tourists each year. West of those mountains is the Gregory Rift, which is the eastern arm of the Great Rift Valley. On the floor of the rift are a number of large salt lakes, including Natron in the north, Manyara in the south, and Eyasi in the southwest. The rift also encompasses the Crater Highlands, which includes the Ngorongoro Conservation Area and the Ngorongoro Crater. To the west of the Crater Highlands lies Serengeti National Park, which is famous for its lions, leopards, elephants, rhinoceroses, and buffalo plus the annual migration of millions of white bearded wildebeest. Just to the southeast of the park is Olduvai Gorge, where many of the oldest hominid fossils and artifacts have been found.

Further northwest is Lake Victoria on the Kenya–Uganda–Tanzania border. This is the largest lake in Africa by surface area and is traditionally named as the source of the Nile River. Southwest of this, separating Tanzania from the Democratic Republic of the Congo, is Lake Tanganyika. This lake is estimated to be the second deepest lake in the world after Lake Baikal in Siberia. The western portion of the country between Lakes Victoria, Tanganyika, and Malawi consists of flat land that has been categorised by the World Wildlife Fund as part of the Central Zambezian miombo woodlands ecoregion. Just upstream from the Kalambo Falls, there is one of the most important archaeological sites in Africa. Tanzania's Southern Highlands are in the southwestern part of the country, around the northern end of Lake Malawi. Mbeya is the largest city in the Southern Highlands.

The centre of Tanzania is a large plateau, which is part of the East African Plateau. The southern half of this plateau is grassland within the Eastern miombo woodlands ecoregion, the majority of which is covered by the huge Selous National Park. Further north the plateau is arable land and includes the national capital, Dodoma.

The eastern coast contains Tanzania's largest city and former capital, Dar es Salaam. Just north of this city lies the Zanzibar Archipelago, a semi-autonomous territory of Tanzania which is famous for its spices. The coast is home to areas of East African mangroves, mangrove swamps that are an important habitat for wildlife on land and in the water. A recent global remote sensing analysis suggested that there were 1,256km² of tidal flats in Tanzania, making it the 26th ranked country in terms of tidal flat area.

Watersheds
Eastern and central Tanzania are drained by rivers that empty into the Indian Ocean. The major rivers are, from north to south, the Pangani, Wami, Ruvu, Rufiji, Matandu, Mbwemkuru, and the Ruvuma River, which forms the southern border with Mozambique.

Most of Northern Tanzania drains into Lake Victoria, which empties into the Nile River.

The western portion of Tanzania is in the watershed of Lake Tanganyika, which drains into the Congo River. The Malagarasi River is the largest tributary of Lake Tanganyika.

Part of southwestern Tanzania drains into Lake Malawi, which empties south into the Zambezi River.

The Southern Eastern Rift area of north-central Tanzania is made up of several endorheic basins, which have no outlet to the sea and drain into salt and/or alkaline lakes. Lake Rukwa in west-central Tanzania, is another endorheic basin.

Climate
Tanzania has a mainly tropical climate but has regional variations due to topography. In the highlands, temperatures range between  during cold and hot seasons respectively and a subtropical highland climate is found. The hottest period extends between November and February while the coldest period occurs between May and August.

Seasonal rainfall is driven mainly by the migration of the Intertropical Convergence Zone. It migrates southwards through Tanzania in October to December, reaching the south of the country in January and February, and returning northwards in March, April, and May. This causes the north and east of Tanzania to experience two distinct wet periods – the short rains (or "Vuli") in October to December and the long rains (or "Masika") from March to May  – while the southern, western, and central parts of the country experience one wet season that continues October through to April or May. Some inland areas of Tanzania have a hot semi-arid climate.

Across Tanzania, the onset of the long rains averages 25 March and the cessation averages 21 May. A warmer-than-normal South Atlantic Ocean coupled with a cooler-than-normal Eastern Indian Ocean often causes the onset to be delayed.

Examples

Climate change

Statistics

Location: Eastern Africa, bordering the Indian Ocean, between Kenya and Mozambique.

Geographic coordinates: 

Continent: Africa

Area:
note: includes the islands of Mafia, Pemba, and Unguja
total: 
land:  
water: 

Land boundaries:
total: 
border countries: Burundi , Kenya , Malawi , Mozambique , Rwanda , Uganda , Zambia , Democratic Republic of the Congo 

Coastline: 

Maritime claims:
exclusive economic zone:  and 
territorial sea: 

Terrain: plains along coast; central plateau; highlands in north, south

Elevation extremes:
lowest point:  Indian Ocean 0 m
highest point: Mount Kilimanjaro 

Natural resources:
hydropower, tin, phosphates, iron ore, coal, diamonds, gemstones, gold, natural gas, nickel

Land use:
arable land:           12.25%
permanent crops:       1.79%
other:                 85.96% (2011)

Irrigated land:  (2003)

Total renewable water resources:  (2011)

Natural hazards:

flooding on the central plateau during the rainy season; drought
volcanism: limited volcano activity; Ol Doinyo Lengai (elevation ) has emitted lava in recent years; other historically active volcanoes include Kieyo and Meru

Environment - current issues:
soil degradation; deforestation; desertification; destruction of coral reef threatens marine habitats; recent droughts affected marginal agriculture; wildlife threatened by illegal hunting and trade, especially for ivory

'Environment - international agreements:party to:''
Biodiversity
United Nations Framework Convention on Climate Change
Kyoto Protocol to the United Nations Framework Convention on Climate Change
United Nations Convention to Combat Desertification in Those Countries Experiencing Serious Drought and/or Desertification, Particularly in Africa
Convention on International Trade in Endangered Species of Wild Fauna and Flora
Basel Convention on the Control of Transboundary Movements of Hazardous Wastes and Their Disposal
United Nations Convention on the Law of the Sea
Vienna Convention for the Protection of the Ozone Layer
Convention on Wetlands of International Importance, especially as Waterfowl Habitat

Specific geographic regions
Menai Bay Conservation Area
Mount Kilimanjaro
Mount Meru
Olduvai Gorge
Umba Valley

Extreme points 

This is a list of the extreme points of Tanzania, the points that are farther north, south, east or west than any other location.

 Northernmost point - unnamed point on the border with Uganda in the Kagera river immediately east of the Ugandan town of Kikagati, Kagera Region
 Easternmost point - Mnazi, Mtwara Region
 Easternmost point (mainland) - unnamed headland immediately east of the town of Mwambo, Mtwara Region
 Southernmost point - unnamed location on the border with Mozambique in the Ruvuma River, Ruvuma Region
 Westernmost point - unnamed headland immediately west of Ujiji, Kigoma Region

References